The 12th Cinemalaya Independent Film Festival was held from August 5–14, 2016 in Metro Manila, Philippines. This marks the return of full-length films after their absence in last year's edition. A total of nine full-length features and ten short films competed. The festival was opened by Carlo Obispo's 1-2-3 and was closed by Gil Portes' Ang Hapis at Himagsik ni Hermano Puli. At the awards night, both Pamilya Ordinaryo and Tuos dominated, with each receiving five awards. Pamilya Ordinaryo won Best Film.

Entries
The winning film is highlighted with boldface and a dagger.

Full-Length Features

Short films

Awards
The awards ceremony was held on August 14, 2016 at the Tanghalang Nicanor Abelardo, Cultural Center of the Philippines.

Full-Length Features
 Best Film – Pamilya Ordinaryo by Eduardo Roy, Jr.
 Special Jury Prize – Mercury is Mine by Jason Paul Laxamana
 Audience Choice Award – Tuos by Derick Cabrido
 Best Direction – Eduardo Roy, Jr. for Pamilya Ordinaryo
 Best Actor – Tommy Abuel for Dagsin
 Best Actress – Hasmine Kilip for Pamilya Ordinaryo
 Best Supporting Actor –  Lou Veloso, Jun Urbano, Leo Rialp and Nanding Josef for Hiblang Abo
 Best Supporting Actress – 
Lollie Mara for Ang Bagong Pamilya ni Ponching 
Elizabeth Oropesa for I America
 Best Screenplay – Jason Paul Laxamana for Mercury is Mine
 Best Cinematography – Mycko David Tuos
 Best Editing – Carlo Francisco Manatad for Pamilya Ordinaryo
 Best Sound – Monoxide Works for Tuos
 Best Original Music Score – Jema Pamintuan for Tuos
 Best Production Design – Steff Dereja for Tuos
 NETPAC Award – Pamilya Ordinaryo by Eduardo Roy, Jr.

Short films
 Best Short Film – Pektus by Isabel Quesada
 Special Jury Prize – Fish Out of Water by Ramon A.L. Garilao
 Audience Choice Award – Forever Natin by Cyrus Valdez
 Best Direction – Ramon A.L. Garilao for Fish Out of Water
 Best Screenplay – Isabel Quesada for Pektus
 NETPAC Award –  Ang Maangas, Ang Marikit, at Ang Makata by Jose Ibarra Guballa

References

External links
Cinemalaya Independent Film Festival

Cinemalaya Independent Film Festival
Cine
Cine
2016 in Philippine cinema